Rangdajied United FC (formerly known as Ar-Hima) is an Indian professional association football club based in Mawngap-Mawphlang, in the south-west of Shillong, East Khasi hills, Meghalaya. Founded in 1987, the club participated in I-League 2nd Division, and won the league in 2012–13 season. The club was later featured in the then top tier league in the country, I-league, during 2013–14 season. They also compete in the Shillong Premier League, the top tier state football league in Meghalaya.

Name
The club was formerly known as Ar-Hima, that literally means "The Two Kingdoms". During the 2012–13 season, the club has changed its name to Rangdajied United FC.

"Rangdajied" in the Khasi language is an expression which signifies a brave, courageous, patriotic man at the prime of his youth.

History
Rangdajied United was founded in 1987 as Ar-Hima. The club has participated in various editions of the Shillong Premier League and enjoyed massive rivalries with their fellow Shillong based clubs Shillong Lajong FC and Royal Wahingdoh FC.

The club has participated in the 2013 I-League 2nd Division and qualified for the main round.
Having won the 2013 I-League 2nd Division Final Round held at Bangalore, Rangdajied qualified for the I-League. On 20 November 2013, Rangdajied agreed the signings of Indian national team stars Gouramangi Singh, Subrata Pal, Sandesh Jhingan, Manandeep Singh, and Tomba Singh, and competed in the 2013–14 season. They finished as 11th in the league table with 25 points in 24 matches.

In the following season Rangdajied was evicted from I-League for not fulfilling the Asian Football Confederation's club licensing criteria.

After clinching the 2013 Shillong Premier League, Rangdajied finished as runners-up in 2016 season, and in 2019 Shillong Premier League, they again finished achieved runners-up position with 22 points in 12 matches.

Sponsorship
Rangdajied United was sponsored by Italian athletic footwear and apparel manufacturer Diadora. It was the first Indian soccer club to be sponsored by Diadora.
 
They also had Football Solutions, a New Delhi based Football Consultancy Firm as a sponsor.

Rivalries

Shillong Derby
In I-League, there were consecutive promotions and relegations of Meghalayan teams Rangdajied United (2013–14 I-League), Royal Wahingdoh (2014–15 I-League) and Shillong Lajong (2018–19 I-League). During the both domestic and regional leagues, Rangdajied played against both Shillong Lajong and Royal Wahingdoh respectively in the "Shillong Derby".

The first match of the derby in I-League to be played was on 22 November 2013 between Shillong Lajong and Rangdajied United that ended in a 1–1 draw. Both the rivalries continued thereafter in Shillong Premier League for a brief period until the teams were dissolved.

Home stadium

Rangdajied United plays all their home games at the Jawaharlal Nehru Stadium in Shillong, which has a capacity of approximately 30,000 spectators. It has artificial turf.

Notable players
For all current and former notable players of Rangdajied United with a Wikipedia article, see: Rangdajied United FC players.

Past internationals
The players below had senior international cap(s) for their respective countries. Players whose name is listed, represented their countries before or after playing for Rangdajied United FC.
 Kim Song-yong (2013–2014)

Honours

Domestic tournaments
 I-League 2nd Division
Champions (1): 2012–13
 Shillong Premier League
Champions (1): 2013
Runners-up (1): 2016, 2019
 Meghalaya State League
Runners-up (1): 2019

See also

 List of football clubs in Meghalaya

References

Further reading

External links

Rangdajied United FC at Global Sports Archive
Goal.com page
Rangdajied United FC at the-aiff.com
Team profile at WorldFootball.net

Rangdajied United FC
Football clubs in Meghalaya
I-League clubs
I-League 2nd Division clubs
2012 establishments in Meghalaya
Association football clubs established in 2012